Waldo LaSalle Schmitt (June 25, 1887 – August 5, 1977) was an American biologist born in Washington, D.C. He received his Ph.D. from George Washington University in 1922. In 1948, he received an honorary Doctor of Science degree from the University of Southern California. Schmitt's primary field of zoological investigation was carcinology, with special emphasis on the decapod crustaceans (crabs, lobsters, shrimp, and so on). His bibliography consists of more than seventy titles.

Background
He was married to Alvina Stumm.
Schmitt was an Aide in Economic Botany for the United States Department of Agriculture (1907–1910)
Appointed Scientific Aide in the Division of Marine Invertebrates of the United States National Museum
Studied Crustacea with Mary Jane Rathbun
Served on the staff of the United States Bureau of Fisheries as Scientific Assistant
Naturalist aboard the Albatross (1911–1914)
Assistant Curator at the United States National Museum as in the Division of Marine Invertebrates (1915–1920)
Instructor of Zoology at George Washington University (1917)
Named Curator of the Division of Marine Invertebrates (1920–1943)
Head Curator of the Department of Biology (1943)
Head Curator of Zoology (1943–1957)
Honorary Research Associate and continued his association with the Smithsonian Institution until his death on 5 August 1977.

Biological expeditions 

1918 studying the life history of the spiny lobster at the Scripps Institution of Oceanography, La Jolla, California.
1924–1925, was at the Carnegie Institution's Marine Laboratory at Dry Tortugas, Florida, surveying the crustacean fauna of the area, identifying crustaceans found in the stomachs of fishes.
1925, awarded the Smithsonian's Walter Rathbone Bacon Traveling Scholarship "for the study of the fauna of countries other than the United States." The scholarship enabled him to collect marine invertebrates along the east coast of South America.
1927 Schmitt was aboard Fleurus at Deception Island
1933–1935, to the Galápagos Islands sponsored by G. Allan Hancock of Los Angeles, California.
1937, a guest of Huntington Hartford, he explored and collected in the West Indies on the Smithsonian-Hartford West Indies Expedition.
 1938, accompanied President Franklin D. Roosevelt as naturalist on the Presidential Cruise to Clipperton Island, Cocos, and the Galapagos Islands.
1939, member of the Hancock South America Expedition and
1940 Biologist in charge of field operations on the first United States Fish and Wildlife Service Alaska king crab investigation.
1941–1942, on special detail with the United States Navy investigating the possibility of establishing a biological station in the Galapagos Islands.
1943, visited South America, under the auspices of the State Department, for the purpose of strengthening relations between United States and Latin American scientists.
1955, headed the Smithsonian–Bredin Belgian Congo Expedition.
1956–1960 led Bredin-sponsored expeditions to the Caribbean (1956, 1958, 1959), the Society Islands (1957), and the Yucatan (1960).
1961–1962 Sponsored by a grant from the Office of Naval Research, Schmitt spent the summers with Harry Pederson photographing the coral reef fauna of the Bahamas Islands.
1962–1963, his last expedition - member of the Survey of the United States Antarctic Research Program, the Staten Island cruise to Marguerite Bay and Weddell Sea.

Participation in Scientific Societies 

Founding member of the Society of Systematic Zoology and served as president in 1948.
President of the Washington Academy of Sciences in 1947.
Trustee of the Bear's Bluff Laboratories,
Trustee of the International Oceanographic Foundation
Trustee of the Serological Museum of Rutgers University.

Legacy

Camp Waldo Schmitt, located in Augusta, West Virginia , is named in honor of Schmitt and his son, Waldo Earnest Schmitt.
Waldo's Wilds, a  park in Takoma Park bears his name. On this property was Schmitt's house. He donated it to the City of Takoma Park who did not have the money to maintain it so they gave it to the county. The house was demolished about 1990. The land had wonderful plants and shrubs he had collected from around the world as well as one of the largest trees in the county on it. 
A seminar room in the National Museum of Natural History (Smithsonian Institution) bears his name.
Schmitt Mesa in Antarctica.
The clam genus Waldo is named after him.

Further reading

References

External links 

Selected photos from Field Books of Waldo LaSalle Schmitt
Digitised Field Books and articles by Waldo LaSalle Schmitt

American biologists
American carcinologists
1887 births
1977 deaths
George Washington University alumni
People from Takoma Park, Maryland
20th-century American zoologists